Scarlet elf cap or Scarlet elf cup may refer to one of two small scarlet fungi: